The Daytime Emmy Award for Outstanding Special Class Writing is an Emmy award honoring writing in special television programming. Both series and specials are eligible for this category.

Winners and Nominees 
Winners in bold

Outstanding Writing for a Daytime Special Program

1970s 
1974
 Lila Garrett and Sandy Krinski - The ABC Afternoon Playbreak ("Mother of the Bride") (ABC)
 Art Wallace - The ABC Afternoon Playbreak ("Alone with Terror") (ABC)
 Robert J. Shaw - CBS Daytime 90 ("Once in her Life") (CBS)
1975
 Audrey Davis Levin - The ABC Afternoon Playbreak ("Heart in Hiding") (ABC)
 Ruth Brooks Flippen - The ABC Afternoon Playbreak ("Oh, Baby, Baby, Baby...") (ABC)
 Lila Garrett and Sandy Krinski - The ABC Afternoon Playbreak ("The Girl Who Couldn't Lose") (ABC)
1976
 Audrey Davis Levin - First Ladies Diaries ("Edith Wilson") (NBC)
 Ethel Frank - First Ladies Diaries ("Martha Washington") (NBC)

Outstanding Achievement in Coverage of Special Events - Writing

1980s 
1981
 Barry Downes - Macy’s Thanksgiving Day Parade (NBC)
1982
 Bernard Eismann - The Body Human ("The Loving Process: Women") (CBS)

Special Classification of Outstanding Individual Achievement - Writers

1980s 
1980
 Team - The Hollywood Squares (NBC)
1981
 Team - The David Letterman Show (NBC)
 Betty Cornfield, Mary Ann Donahue, and Edward Tivnan - FYI: For Your Information (ABC)
 Team - The Hollywood Squares (NBC)
1982
 Team - FYI: For Your Information (SYN)
1983
 Team - FYI: For Your Information (SYN)
1984
 Team - FYI: For Your Information (SYN)
1985
 Helen Marmor - Hong Kong on Borrowed Time (NBC)
 Team - Breakaway (SYN)
 Team - One to Grow On (NBC)
1986
 Catherine Faulconer - Chagall's Journey (NBC)
 Jane Paley - ABC Notebook ("War In The Family") (ABC)
 Peter Restivo - Soap Opera Special (SYN)
 Team - Jeopardy! (SYN)
 Team - One to Grow On (NBC)
1987
 Team - Jeopardy! (SYN)
 Team - One to Grow On (NBC)
 John William Corrington and Joyce Hooper Corrington - Superior Court (SYN)
 Ben Logan - Taking Children Seriously (NBC)
1988
 David Forman and Barry Adelman - Soap Opera Digest Awards (NBC)
 Team - Scrabble (NBC)
 Team - The Wil Shriner Show (SYN)

Outstanding Special Class Writing

1980s 
1989
 Scott J.T. Frank and Tom Avitabile - When I Grow Up (CBS)
 David Forman and Barry Adelman - Soap Opera Digest Awards (NBC)

1990s 
1990
 Robert Kirk - Remembering World War II ("Pearl Harbour") (SYN)
 Glenn Kirschbaum - Remembering World War II ("Hitler: Man & Myth") (SYN)
 Team - The Home Show (ABC)
 Hester Mundis and Toem Perew - The Joan Rivers Show (SYN)
 David Forman and Barry Adelman - Soap Opera Digest Awards (NBC)
1991
 Team - Jeopardy! (SYN)
 Joan Rivers, Hester Mundis, and Toem Perew - The Joan Rivers Show (SYN)
 David Forman and Barry Adelman - Soap Opera Digest Awards (NBC)
1992
 Kerry Millerick, Julie Engleman, and Neal Rogin - Spaceship Earth: Our Global Environment (Disney Channel)
 Team - Jeopardy! (SYN)
 Joan Rivers, Hester Mundis, and Toem Perew - The Joan Rivers Show (SYN)
 Robert Thornton - The Streets (ABC)
1993
 Victoria Costello - This Island Earth (Disney Channel)
 Team - Jeopardy! (SYN)
 Joan Rivers, Hester Mundis, and Toem Perew - The Joan Rivers Show (SYN)
1994
 Team - Jeopardy! (SYN)
 Robert Thornton - Northern Lights (ABC)
1995
 Bob Carruthers - Dinosaurs Myths & Reality (Disney Channel)
 Team - Jeopardy! (SYN)
 Robert Thornton - Wings as Eagles (ABC)
 Rosser Mcdonald - Nicaragua: Finding Peace (NBC)
1996
 Team - Jeopardy! (SYN)
 Rosser Mcdonald - Haiti: Mountains and Hopes (NBC)
 Brad Gyori, Stan Evans, and Mark Tye Turner - Talk Soup (E!)
1997
 Team - Jeopardy! (SYN)
 Team - Leeza (NBC)
 Brad Gyori, Stan Evans, and John Henson - Talk Soup (E!)
1998
 Team - Jeopardy! (SYN)
 Team - Leeza (NBC)
 Team - The Rosie O'Donnell Show (SYN)
 Team - Win Ben Stein's Money (Comedy Central)
1999
 Team - Win Ben Stein's Money (Comedy Central)
 Team - Jeopardy! (SYN)
 Team - Pop-Up Video (Vh1)
 Team - The Rosie O'Donnell Show (SYN)
 Christian McKiernan, Beverly Kopf, and Andrew Smith - The View (ABC)

2000s 
2000
 Team - Win Ben Stein's Money (Comedy Central)
 Team - Jeopardy! (SYN)
 Team - Pop-Up Video (Vh1)
 Team - The Rosie O'Donnell Show (SYN)
 Christian McKiernan, Beverly Kopf, and Andrew Smith - The View (ABC)
2001
 Christian McKiernan, Julie Siegel, and Andrew Smith - The View (ABC)
 Team - Pop-Up Video (Vh1)
 Team - Jeopardy! (SYN)
 Team - The Rosie O'Donnell Show (SYN)
 Team - Win Ben Stein's Money (Comedy Central)
2002
 Team - Jeopardy! (SYN)
 Team - Pop-Up Video (Vh1)
 Team - Spyder Games (MTV)
 Christian McKiernan, Julie Siegel, and Andrew Smith - The View (ABC)
 Team - Win Ben Stein's Money (Comedy Central)
2003
 Team - Jeopardy! (SYN)
 Team - Surprise by Design (Discovery Channel)
 Team - Pop-Up Video (Vh1)
 Christian McKiernan, Julie Siegel, and Andrew Smith - The View (ABC)
 Team - Win Ben Stein's Money (Comedy Central)
2004
 Team - Win Ben Stein's Money (Comedy Central)
 Team - The Ellen DeGeneres Show (SYN)
 Team - Jeopardy! (SYN)
 Christian McKiernan, Julie Siegel, and Andrew Smith - The View (ABC)
2005
 Team - The Ellen DeGeneres Show (SYN)
 Team - Jeopardy! (SYN)
 Christian McKiernan, Julie Siegel, and Andrew Smith - The View (ABC)
2006
 Team - The Ellen DeGeneres Show (SYN)
 Alex Paen - Animal Rescue (SYN)
2007
 Team - The Ellen DeGeneres Show (SYN)
 John Scheinfeld - Biography ("Child Stars: Teen Rockers") (A&E)
 Alex Paen - Animal Rescue (SYN)
2008
 Christian McKiernan, Janette Barber, and Andrew Smith - The View (ABC)
 Team - The Ellen DeGeneres Show (SYN)
 Scott Gardner - Today's Homeowner with Danny Lipford (SYN)
2009
 David Dunlop and Connie Simmons - Landscapes Through Time with David Dunlop (PBS)
 Alex Paen - Animal Rescue (SYN)
 Mark Waxman - Macy’s Thanksgiving Day Parade (NBC)
 Laura McKenzie - Laura McKenzie's Traveler (SYN)
 Team - The Ellen DeGeneres Show (SYN)

2010s 
2010
 Michael Stevens, Sara Lukinson, and George Stevens Jr. - We Are One: The Obama Inaugural Celebration at the Lincoln Memorial (HBO)
 Team - The Bonnie Hunt Show (SYN)
 Alex Paen - Animal Rescue (SYN)
 Team - The Ellen DeGeneres Show (SYN)
2011
 Team - The Ellen DeGeneres Show (SYN)
 Chip Ward and Darley Newman - Equitrekking (PBS)
 Alan J. Weiss, Douglas Arvid Wester, and Deborah Gobble - Teen Kids News (SYN)
 Team - Rally to Restore Sanity and/or Fear (Comedy Central)
2012
 Team - The Ellen DeGeneres Show (SYN)
 Mark Waxman - Macy's Thanksgiving Day Parade (NBC)
 Team - Pop-Up Video (Vh1)
 Christine Ferraro - Sesame Street ("All Together Against Hunger") (PBS)
2013
 Team - The Ellen DeGeneres Show (SYN)
 Chip Ward and Darley Newman - Equitrekking (PBS)
 Anthony Knighton and Brooke Ninowski - The Joni Show (Daystar)
2014
 Team - The Ellen DeGeneres Show (SYN)
 Andrew Ames and Mercedes Ildefonso Velgot - Born to Explore with Richard Wiese (SYN)
 Dave Boone - Disney Parks Christmas Day Parade (ABC)
 Joseph Rosendo - Travelscope (PBS)
 Erin Zimmerman - Made in Israel (ABC Family)
2015
 Andrea Levin, John Redmann, and Anjie Taylor - The Talk (CBS)
 Andrew Ames and Mercedes Ildefonso Velgot - Born to Explore with Richard Wiese (SYN)
 Team - The Ellen DeGeneres Show (SYN)
 Jim Lichtenstein, Stephanie Himango, and John Murphy - The Henry Ford’s Innovation Nation (CBS)
2016 
 Jim Lichtenstein, Stephanie Himango, and John Murphy - The Henry Ford’s Innovation Nation (CBS)
 Team - 30th Independent Spirit Awards (IFC)
 Erin Zimmerman - The Hope: The Rebirth of Israel, Part 2 (ABC Family)
 Bianca Giaever - Videos 4 U: I Love You (This American Life)
 Vince Sherry - Xploration Earth 2050 (FOX)
2017
 Tim McKeon, Mark De Angelis, and Adam Peltzman - Odd Squad: The Movie (PBS)
 Brad Lachman and Mark Waxman - Macy's Thanksgiving Day Parade (NBC)
 Team - The Ellen DeGeneres Show (SYN)
 Team - 31st Independent Spirit Awards (IFC)
 John Chester - SuperSoul Shorts ("Maggie the Cow") (OWN)
2018
 Team - Super Soul Sunday: The Orphan (OWN)
 Team - The Ellen DeGeneres Show (SYN)
 Team - The Henry Ford's Innovation Nation (CBS)
 Team - Xploration Earth 2050 (SYN)
 Team - Xploration Outer Space (SYN)

2020s 
2021
 Xploration Outer Space (SYN)
 The Henry Ford's Innovation Nation (CBS)
 Life 2.0 (SYN)
 Lucky Dog with Brandon McMillan (CBS)
 This Old House (PBS)
 Rock the Park (SYN)

References 

Special Class Writing